The Castle of Zamora is a Middle Ages fortress in Zamora, Spain.  It stands northwest of the city's Cathedral.

It features Pre-Roman foundations and a Romanesque general structure. It was built between the 10th and 12th centuries. It stands northwest of the Cathedral, with magnificent views of the town and the river from the keep. 

Zamora
Buildings and structures in Zamora, Spain